Aleksander Marek Szczygło  (27 October 1963 – 10 April 2010) was a Polish politician. He was first elected to Polish parliament Sejm in 2001 and subsequently reelected on 25 September 2005 with 19,006 votes in 35th electoral district (Olsztyn). Both times he was a candidate of the Law and Justice party.

From 7 February 2007 until 16 November 2007 he was Minister of National Defence in the cabinet of Jarosław Kaczyński.

From 15 January 2009 until his death he was the chief of the National Security Bureau.

He was listed on the flight manifest of the Tupolev Tu-154 of the 36th Special Aviation Regiment carrying the President of Poland Lech Kaczyński which crashed near Smolensk-North airport near Pechersk near Smolensk, Russia, on 10 April 2010, killing all aboard.

In 2010, Szczygło was posthumously awarded the Commander's Cross with Star of the Order of Polonia Restituta. He had previously been awarded the Order of Merit of the Republic of Hungary in 2009 and the Ukrainian Order of Merit 2nd Class.


Scholarly Articles And Publications 
Historical propaganda in Russia

Gallery

See also
 Members of Polish Sejm 2001-2005
 Members of Polish Sejm 2005–2007

References

External links
 Aleksander Marek Szczygło – parliamentary page – includes declarations of interest, voting record, and transcripts of speeches.

1963 births
2010 deaths
People from Olsztyn County
Ministers of National Defence of Poland
Members of the Polish Sejm 2005–2007
Members of the Polish Sejm 2001–2005
Law and Justice politicians
Commanders with Star of the Order of Polonia Restituta
Recipients of the Order of Merit of the Republic of Hungary
Recipients of the Order of Merit (Ukraine), 2nd class
University of Gdańsk alumni
Victims of the Smolensk air disaster
Polish Roman Catholics
Law and Justice MEPs
MEPs for Poland 2004
Members of the Polish Sejm 2007–2011